Pavel Aleksandrovich Vtyurin (born 23 August 1981) is a Russian former professional football player.

Club career
He played in the Russian Football National League for FC Torpedo Vladimir in the 2011–12 season.

References

External links
 

1981 births
People from Vladimir, Russia
Living people
Russian footballers
Russia under-21 international footballers
Association football forwards
Association football midfielders
FC Spartak Kostroma players
FC Tekstilshchik Ivanovo players
FC Olimp-Dolgoprudny players
FC Torpedo Vladimir players
Sportspeople from Vladimir Oblast